Danger Zone, The Danger Zone, or Dangerzone may refer to:

Film and television
Danger Zone (1951 film), an American film noir by William Berke
Danger Zone (1996 film), an American action film by Allan Eastman
"Danger Zone" (Grey's Anatomy), a 2017 TV episode

Music

Albums
Danger Zone (Hardline album) or the title song, 2012
Danger Zone (Lord Kossity album) or the title song, 2006
Danger Zone (Sammy Hagar album) or the title song, 1980
Danger Zone (EP), by China White, 1981
The Danger Zone (album), by Big L, 2011
Danger Zone, by Player, 1978
Danger Zone, by Sinner, 1984
Danger Zone, by Tuff Crew, 1988

Songs
"Danger Zone" (song), by Kenny Loggins, 1986
"Danger Zone", by Black Sabbath from Seventh Star, 1986
"Dangerzone", a song by Chris Sorbello, 2010
"Danger Zone", by Crystal Gayle from Miss the Mississippi, 1979
"Danger Zone", by Gwen Stefani from Love. Angel. Music. Baby., 2004
"Danger Zone", by Nash the Slash from Children of the Night, 1981
"Danger Zone", by Planet Patrol, 1984
"Danger Zone", by Rainbow from Down to Earth, 1979
"Danger Zone", by the Ramones from Too Tough to Die, 1984
"Dangerzone", by Vanilla Ninja from Love Is War, 2006
"Danger Zone", by the Vels from House of Miracles, 1986

Video games
Danger Zone (video game), a 2017 racing game
Jurassic Park III: Danger Zone!, a 2001 action-adventure game

Other 
Danger zone (food safety), the temperature range in which foodborne bacteria can grow
Danger triangle of the face
"Danger zone", the loose areolar connective tissue of the human scalp
Danger Zone, a 1975 novel by Maurice Shadbolt
The Danger Zone, a book series published by Salariya Book Company